Karis Teetan (born 3 June 1990 in Mauritius) is a horse racing jockey in Hong Kong. He was a South African Champion Apprentice in 2008. He start riding in Hong Kong at August 2013. He also has won with more than 400 winners in Hong Kong and won the Hong Kong International Jockeys' Championship in 2019.

Performance at the Hong Kong Jockey Club

Major wins
 Hong Kong
 Hong Kong Sprint - (1) - Mr Stunning (2018)
 Chairman's Sprint Prize - (1) - Mr Stunning (2020)
 Hong Kong Champions & Chater Cup - (1) - Panfield (2021)
 Hong Kong Classic Cup - (1) - Thunder Fantasy (2015)
 Hong Kong Derby - (1) - Romantic Warrior (2022)
 Queen Elizabeth II Cup - (1) - Romantic Warrior (2022)

 South Africa
 Castle Tankard - (1) - Grisham (2011)
 Paddock Stakes - (1) - Thunder Dance (2012)
 Daily News 2000 - (1) - Jackson (2012)
 Cape Derby - (1) - Jackson (2012)
 Empress Club Stakes - (1) - Jackson (2012)

References

Hong Kong jockeys
1990 births
Living people
Mauritian people
Hong Kong people by ethnic or national origin